Lody Kong is an American sludge metal band from Phoenix, Arizona, formed in 2011. The band is known for being led by brothers Igor and Zyon Cavalera, both sons of former Sepultura and current Soulfly frontman Max Cavalera. The band has been inactive since 2018.

History 
Lody Kong formed in 2011 after the split of metalcore quintet Mold Breaker, which included Zyon and Igor on drums and guitar, respectively. Recruiting local musicians John Bauer (lead guitar) and Shea "Shanks" Fahey (bass), Igor covered vocal duties and Lody Kong began writing material, adopting their name from their friend Cody Long. In 2012 they released their first demo tracks "Rumsfield" and "Crazy Joe", and opened for Soulfly on the inaugural Maximum Cavalera Tour.

After the tour in early 2013, the quartet entered the studio with producer Roy Mayorga to record their debut EP, entitled No Rules and released digitally on December 17 via Minus Head Records, after being available on tour throughout the year (with Zyon eventually joining his father in Soulfly), along with a music video for the track "Monkeys Always Look". In 2014 they released an extra track entitled "Some Pulp", while in 2015 Igor toured on bass guitar with Soulfly after the departure of Tony Campos. News surfaced in late 2015 that the group were set to release an album in 2016 consisting of recordings made up to two years previously with producer John Gray.

In January 2016 Lody Kong announced their debut album, Dreams and Visions, will be released on March 25 worldwide via Mascot Label Group. During the 2016 Maximum Cavalera Tour they debuted new members, Travis Stone (lead guitar) and Noah Shepherd (bass). On February 26, they released a lyric video for the song "Chillin', Killin'". Shepherd left the band later in 2016 with Igor moving to vocals and bass. Since 2018 the band has been inactive, with members focussing on other projects: Zyon with Soulfly, Igor Jr with Go Ahead and Die (as Igor Amadeus Cavalera) and Travis with Pig Destroyer. Igor and Travis have also formed the stoner metal band Healing Magic, releasing their first EP in 2020.

Musical style 
Lody Kong's music differs greatly from the members' other projects and associated acts (such as the metalcore of Mold Breaker or groove metal of Soulfly). Critics and media have often referred to the band as a mix of sludge metal, punk rock, hardcore punk, grunge and thrash metal.

Personnel

Current lineup
Igor Cavalera Jr. – vocals (2011–present), bass (2016–present), rhythm guitar (2011–2016)
Zyon Cavalera – drums (2011–present)
Travis Stone – lead guitar (2016–present), rhythm guitar (2016–present)

Former members 
John Bauer – lead guitar (2011–2016)
Shea "Shanks" Fahey – bass (2011–2016)
Noah Shepherd – bass (2016)

Timeline

Discography 
Demos
Bird EP (2012, self-released)

Extended plays
No Rules (2013, Minus Head Records)

Studio albums
Dreams and Visions (2016, Mascot Label Group)

References 

Family musical groups
Hardcore punk groups from Arizona
Musical groups established in 2011
Musical groups from Phoenix, Arizona
American musical trios
American sludge metal musical groups
Heavy metal musical groups from Arizona
2011 establishments in Arizona